(A) Touch of Class may refer to:
 A small amount of sophistication

Music
 A Touch of Class (band), also known as ATC, international pop group based in Germany
 A Touch of Class (album), 1978 big band jazz album by the Thad Jones/Mel Lewis Jazz Orchestra
 A Touch of Class, 1991 reggae album by Sugar Minott
 Touch of Class, a 1999 hip-hop album by Classified
 A Touch of Class, a 1999 Salsa album by Pete "El Conde" Rodríguez
 Touch of Class (band), an American R&B group active since 1975

Film and television
 A Touch of Class (film), 1973 British comedy film
 "A Touch of Class" (Fawlty Towers), 1975 pilot episode of Fawlty Towers
 "A Touch of Class", 2004 season 1 episode of Hustle

Other
 Touch of Class (horse), a thoroughbred mare on the 1976 United States Olympic equestrian team

See also
 "A Touch of Glass", an episode of Only Fools and Horses